The aluminum industry in the United States in 2014 produced 1.72 million metric tons of primary aluminum, worth 3.97 billion dollars, at nine aluminum smelters. In addition, the US produced 1.70 million tons of secondary aluminum from old (post-consumer) scrap, and 1.93 million tons of aluminum from new (manufacturing) scrap. The US was the world's 6th largest producer of primary aluminum in 2014. The industry employed 29,000 people.

Primary production
In 2014, primary aluminum, which is produced from bauxite, was produced by three companies at nine smelters. Primary aluminum is preferred for high-quality uses such as aircraft. The leader in US production was Alcoa. Also operating multiple primary plants was Century Aluminum.

Primary Aluminum Smelters in the US

Secondary production
Secondary production is the recycling of metallic aluminum derived from scrap. Secondary production can be from either new scrap (from aluminum manufacturing), or from old scrap (post-consumer scrap such as recycled aluminum cans).

Raw materials

The principal raw materials for aluminum production are bauxite (for primary production) and scrap (for secondary production).

Primary aluminum production consumes a great deal of electricity, which makes up about a third of the cost. Making a ton of primary aluminum consumes at least 12,500 kW-hr, and most plants consume 14,500 to 15,000 kW-hr per ton of primary aluminum.

Secondary production of a given unit of aluminum requires about 10% of the electricity of primary production.

The United States mined production of bauxite for primary aluminum production is insignificant. In 2013, the US mined only 1.3 percent of the bauxite it used, US mined production being less than 0.1 percent of world production.

International trade
The US imported nearly all the bauxite (the only commercial aluminum ore) used in producing primary aluminum. For years, the US has produced less than 1% of the bauxite used to make aluminum.

The US also imported 33 percent of the aluminum metal that was used in 2014. Of the imported aluminum, 63% came from Canada.

History of US aluminum production
The US used to be a much more important factor in the world primary aluminum market. As recently as 1981, the US produced 30% of the world's primary aluminum, and for many years up through 2000, the US was the world's largest producer of primary aluminum. In 2014, by contrast, the US ranked sixth in primary aluminum production, and provided only 3.5% of world production.

US  production of primary aluminum peaked in 1980 at 4.64 million metric tons. Since then, US primary aluminum production has fallen by more than half, but secondary production has increased, making up much of the difference. In the 1950s and 1960s, primary production made up about 80% of the aluminum output. In 2014, primary production made up 32%, while secondary from new scrap made up 36% and secondary from old scrap made up 32% of US aluminum production.

Climate impact and market competitiveness 
The development of tools which calculate upfront carbon emissions is expected to bring changes to the relative competitiveness for US-produced aluminum products, and result in states with cleaner electric grids gaining a competitive advantage both for sourcing aluminum construction materials, and for siting of new aluminum industry facilities.

See also
 The Aluminum Association

References

Industry